Wury Estu Handayani (Indonesian: [wʌɹisuːhænde͡ɪˈɑːni]; born 6 March 1974) is a Indonesian civil servant who is the 13th Second Spouse of Indonesia. She is the wife of the 13th Vice President of Indonesia, Ma'ruf Amin. She served as a civil servant who worked at the South Jakarta Health Department from 1995 to 2019, and previously held the position of Treasurer of the Indonesian Dental Nurses Association from 2005 to 2010.

Early life 
Handayani was born in Jakarta on March 6, 1974. She completed her undergraduate education at the Poltekkes Dental Health Academy of the Indonesian Department of Health in 2001. As a student, she demonstrated a strong commitment to her field of study and was active in various extracurricular activities. After graduation, she began her career as a dental nurse at a health center in Pasar Minggu, South Jakarta. This experience provided her with valuable insights into the health needs of her community and helped to further develop her skills and dedication to public service. Handayani is Amin's second wife, as his first wife died from cancer in 2013. She was also a widow before her marriage to Amin, as her first husband died in 2012. Despite these difficult personal circumstances, Handayani has remained resilient and has continued to dedicate herself to her work and her community. She is a mother of two daughters from her previous marriage, both of whom she raised on her own.

Marriage and office 
Handayani and Amin were introduced to each other through mutual friends and quickly realized that they had a strong connection. They decided to get married soon after, in a ceremony at the Istiqlal Mosque in Jakarta on May 31, 2014. The wedding was attended by many prominent figures from politics and society, including former Vice President Jusuf Kalla and former Minister of Economy Hatta Rajasa, who served as witnesses. As the wife of the Vice President, Handayani has had the opportunity to represent Indonesia in various international events and has used this platform to promote the country's culture and heritage. She is also actively involved in charitable and social causes, particularly those related to healthcare and education. Her commitment to public service and dedication to making a positive impact on the lives of others have made her a respected and admired figure in her community.

References 

Civil servants
1974 births
Living people